The Senegal national football team (French: Équipe de football du Senegal), nicknamed the Lions of Teranga, represents Senegal in international association football and is operated by the Senegalese Football Federation. They are the current champions of the Africa Cup of Nations and African Nations Championship.

One of Africa's most famous national football teams, Senegal reached the quarter-finals of the 2002 FIFA World Cup, becoming the second team from Africa (after Cameroon in 1990). They managed to upset defending world champions France, finish second in their group, and beat Sweden in extra time in the round of 16, before losing to Turkey in the quarter-finals.

Senegal’s first appearance in the Africa Cup of Nations was in 1965, when they lost 1–0 to Ivory Coast for 4th place. They hosted the 1992 African Cup of Nations, where they made it to the quarter-finals, and won their first AFCON at the 2021 Africa Cup of Nations, defeating Egypt in the final.

History

Early history
Senegal gained its independence from France on 4 April 1960, and the Senegalese Football Federation (FSF) was founded that year. The first Senegal match took place on 31 December 1961 against Dahomey (now Benin), a 3–2 loss. The FSF has been affiliated with FIFA since 1962 and has been a member of the Confederation of African Football (CAF) since 1963. Senegal's first appearance in the Africa Cup of Nations was in 1965, where they finished second in their group, and lost 1–0 to Ivory Coast to finish in fourth place. After a group stage exit at the AFCON three years later, they would not qualify for the tournament until 1986.

1990s and 2000s
In the 1990 Africa Cup of Nations, Senegal finished fourth; they hosted the 1992 tournament, where after finishing second in their group, they were eliminated by Cameroon in the quarterfinals.
Senegal lost the 2002 final on a penalty shootout after drawing 0–0 with Cameroon. Later that year, Senegal made their debut appearance at the World Cup. After defeating defending world champions France in their opening game, they drew with Denmark and Uruguay to progress from the group stage, then beat Sweden in extra time in the round of 16 to reach the quarter-finals, one of only four African teams to do so (alongside Cameroon in 1990, Ghana in 2010 and Morocco in 2022). There, they lost to Turkey in extra time.

Senegal qualified for the 2008 Africa Cup of Nations, but finished third in their group with two points. They failed to make the 2010 FIFA World Cup in South Africa, the first World Cup to be held in Africa.

2010s
Senegal was eliminated from the 2012 Africa Cup of Nations with zero wins and zero points.

After former manager Bruno Metsu died on 14 October 2013, many Senegalese players were recalled to appear and have a moment of silence in memory of the manager who helped them reach the quarter-final in the 2002 World Cup. All activities of the national league and the national team were suspended for a few days in his memory.

The West African nation narrowly missed the 2014 FIFA World Cup after losing in a round-robin match against Ivory Coast in the final qualification round. Senegal qualified for two Africa Cup of Nations tournaments before the next World Cup, being eliminated in the group stage in 2015 and reaching the quarterfinals in 2017. On 10 November 2017, after defeating South Africa 2–0, Senegal qualified for the 2018 FIFA World Cup, their first since 2002. Senegal defeated Poland 2–1 in their opening group match, thanks to an own goal by Thiago Cionek and a M'Baye Niang strike. In the next group stage match, Senegal drew 2–2 against Japan, with goals from Sadio Mané and Moussa Wagué. A 1–0 loss to Colombia in their final match meant they finished level on points with Japan, who progressed thanks to a superior fair play record. Thus, Senegal was eliminated in the group stage for the first time in its World Cup history.

Aliou Cissé, who participated in the 2002 AFCON, managed Senegal to a runner-up campaign in the 2019 Africa Cup of Nations. Having lost 1–0 to Algeria earlier in the tournament, Senegal lost 1–0 to them again in the final.

2020s
Deprived of many players due to COVID-19, Senegal participated in the 2021 Africa Cup of Nations, postponed to 2022 because of the pandemic; they beat Zimbabwe in their first match 1–0 and drew their next two games, enough to finish first in their group. In the round of 16, Senegal faced Cape Verde. Mané recorded a shot that hit the post in the first minute. Patrick Andrade was sent off in the 21st minute, after intervention of the video assistant referee. Despite their dominance, the first half ended without a single shot on target; Mané opened the scoring a few minutes into the second half, following a corner.

Senegal faced Equatorial Guinea in the quarter-finals. The Lions opened the scoring half an hour into the game, by Famara Diédhiou on a pass from Mané; Senegal eventually won 3–1. In the semi-finals, Senegal faced Burkina Faso, winning 3–1 again. In the final, Senegal faced Egypt, who eliminated hosts Cameroon in the semi-finals. In a penalty shootout, Mané scored the winning penalty, to bring Senegal its first Africa Cup of Nations title.  Senegal returned home and took part in a victory parade that took place in the capital, Dakar. It ended up becoming the biggest party in the country's history.

Senegal faced Egypt twice after the AFCON final, eliminating the Egyptians on penalties after being tied 1–1 on aggregate, to qualify for the 2022 FIFA World Cup. Mané eliminated his Liverpool teammate Mohamed Salah after scoring the winning penalty again.
The penalty shootout was however full of controversies with lasers being pointed at Egypt’s penalty takers and goalkeeper. FIFA fined Senegal’s football federation 175,000 Swiss francs as a result of the fan disorder.

For the 2022 World Cup in Qatar, Senegal were drawn in Group A along with the hosts Qatar, Ecuador and the Netherlands. Star man Mané missed out due to injury, but Senegal managed to progress from the group nonetheless.  Though they lost their first game against the Netherlands 2–0, Senegal went on to claim six points against the hosts and then Ecuador in their final game, progressing to the Round of 16, where they lost 3–0 to England. It marked the second time Senegal had progressed past the group stage, in only their third appearance.

Kit history
 

Puma has been the manufacturer of Senegal's kits since 2004. The home kit is typically white, and the away kit is green.

Results and fixtures

The following is a list of match results in the last 12 months, as well as any future matches that have been scheduled.

2022

2023

Coaching staff

Coaching history

Players

Current squad
The following 26 players were called up for the 2022 FIFA World Cup. Sadio Mané withdrew injured on 17 November, and was replaced on 20 November by Moussa N'Diaye.

Caps and goals correct as of 4 December 2022, after the match against England.

Recent call-ups
The following players have been called up for Senegal in the last 12 months.

INJ

INJ

DEC Player refused to join the team after the call-up.
INJ Player withdrew from the squad due to an injury.
PRE Preliminary squad.
RET Player has retired from international football.
SUS Suspended from the national team.

Player records Players in bold are still active with Senegal. Most appearances 

 Top goalscorers 

Competitive record

FIFA World Cup

Senegal have appeared in the finals of the FIFA World Cup on three occasions, in 2002 where they reached the quarter finals, in 2018, and in 2022.

Africa Cup of Nations

Historically, Senegal was seen as a weaker side in the strong West African region. Although they finished in fourth place in two AFCON editions, Senegalese performance was overall still deemed as poor. Senegal remained under the shadow of West African giants Nigeria, Ivory Coast and Ghana for the majority of the 20th century.

In the 2000s, Senegal began to surge and became a more competitive opponent in the Africa Cup of Nations. Following a successful FIFA World Cup debut in 2002, in which the side reached the quarter-finals, Senegal established itself as a new powerhouse in Africa. The 2002 Africa Cup of Nations tournament marked a defeat to Cameroon 2–3 on penalties after a goalless draw in the final. Senegal once again finished as runners-up in 2019, losing the final 0–1 to Algeria, and finally won their first AFCON title in 2021.

{| class="wikitable" style="font-size:90%; text-align:center;" width="60%"
|-
! style="background:#00853F; color:#FDEF42; " colspan=10|Africa Cup of Nations record
|-
!Year
!Round
!Position
!
!
!*
!
!
!
!Squad
|-
| 1957
| colspan=9 rowspan=2|Part of  
|-
| 1959
|-
| 1962|| colspan="9" rowspan="2" |Not affiliated to CAF
|-
| 1963
|-style="background:#9acdff;"
| 1965||Fourth place ||4th||3||1||1||1||5||2||Squad
|-
| 1968||Group stage||5th||3||1||1||1||5||5||Squad
|-
| 1970
| colspan=9 rowspan=5|Did not qualify
|-
| 1972 
|-
| 1974 
|-
| 1976
|-
| 1978
|-
| 1980||colspan=9|Did not enter
|-
| 1982|| colspan="9" rowspan="2" |Did not qualify
|-
| 1984
|-
| 1986||Group stage||5th||3||2||0||1||3||1||Squad
|-
| 1988||colspan=9|Did not qualify
|-style="background:#9acdff;"
| 1990
||Fourth place 
||4th
||5
||1
||2
||2
||3
||3||Squad
|-
|style="border: 3px solid red "| 1992||Quarter-finals||5th||3||1||0||2||4||3||Squad
|-
| 1994||Quarter-finals||8th||3||1||0||2||2||3||Squad
|-
| 1996|| colspan="9" rowspan="2" |Did not qualify
|-
| 1998
|-
| 2000||Quarter-finals||7th||4||1||1||2||6||6||Squad
|- bgcolor="silver"
| 2002||Runners-up||2nd||6||4||2||0||6||1||Squad
|-
| 2004||Quarter-finals||6th||4||1||2||1||4||2||Squad
|-style="background:#9acdff;"
| 2006||Fourth place||4th||6||2||0||4||7||8||Squad
|-
| 2008||Group stage||12th||3||0||2||1||4||6||Squad
|-
| 2010||colspan=9|Did not qualify
|-
| 2012||Group stage||13th||3||0||0||3||3||6||Squad
|-
| 2013||colspan=9|Did not qualify
|-
| 2015||Group stage||9th||3||1||1||1||3||4||Squad
|-
| 2017||Quarter-finals||5th||4||2||2||0||6||2||Squad
|- bgcolor="silver"
| 2019
||Runners-up||2nd||7||5||0||2||8||2||Squad
|- bgcolor="gold"
| 2021
|Champions
|1st 
|7
|4
|3
|0
|9
|2
|Squad 
|-
| 2023||rowspan=2 colspan=9|To be determined
|-
| 2025
|-
! style="background:#00853F; color:#FDEF42; "|Total
! style="background:#00853F; color:#FDEF42; " |1 Title
! style="background:#00853F; color:#FDEF42; " |16/33
! style="background:#00853F; color:#FDEF42; " |67
! style="background:#00853F; color:#FDEF42; " |27
! style="background:#00853F; color:#FDEF42; " |17
! style="background:#00853F; color:#FDEF42; " |23
! style="background:#00853F; color:#FDEF42; " |78
! style="background:#00853F; color:#FDEF42; " |56
| style="background:#00853F; color:#FDEF42; "|—
|}

African Nations Championship

Amílcar Cabral Cup

WAFU Nations Cup

Other records

Head-to-head record
The list shown below shows the Senegal national football team all−time international record against opposing nations.

As of 4 December 2022 after match against .
Key

Honours

  Africa Cup of Nations
 Champions: 2021
 Runners-up: 2002, 2019

 African Nations Championship
 Champions: 2022

 African Games
 Gold Medal: 2015
 Amílcar Cabral Cup
 Champions: 1979, 1980, 1983, 1984, 1985, 1986, 1991, 2001
 Runners-up: 1982, 1993, 1997, 2000, 2005
 WAFU Nations Cup
 Champions: 2019
 Runners-up: 2010, 2013
 Friendship Games
 Champions: 1963
 Jeux de la Francophonie
 Runners-up: 2005
 COSAFA Cup
 Runners-up: 2021

See also
Senegal national under-20 football team
Football in Senegal

References

External links

Senegal at Galsenfoot
Senegal at the NFT
Senegal at FIFA (archived)
Senegal team World Cup 2022

 
African national association football teams
Africa Cup of Nations-winning countries